The 2015 League of Ireland Premier Division was the 31st season of the League of Ireland Premier Division. Dundalk were champions and Cork City finished as runners-up.

Teams

Stadia and locations

Personnel and kits

Note: Flags indicate national team as has been defined under FIFA eligibility rules. Players may hold more than one non-FIFA nationality.

Overview
The 2015 Premier Division consisted of 12 teams. Each team played each other three times for a total of 33 games.  The season began on 6 March and concluded on 30 October. On 9 October, with three games still remaining, Dundalk retained the title after a 1–1 draw with Shamrock Rovers.

Final table

Results

Matches 1–22

Matches 23–33

Top scorers

Awards

Team of the Year

Promotion/relegation playoff
Limerick, the eleventh placed team from the Premier Division played off against Finn Harps, the winner of the 2015 First Division play off, to decide who would play in the 2016 Premier Division.

Finn Harps won 2–1 on aggregate and were promoted to 2016 Premier Division. Limerick are relegated to the 2016 First Division.

See also

 2015 League of Ireland Cup
 2015 League of Ireland First Division
 2015 St Patrick's Athletic F.C. season

Notes

References

 
League of Ireland Premier Division seasons
1
1
Ireland
Ireland